The Okse Bay Group is a geologic group in Northwest Territories. It preserves fossils dating back to the Devonian period.

See also

 List of fossiliferous stratigraphic units in Northwest Territories

References
 

Devonian Northwest Territories